Mayur Verma (born 6 October 1991)
is an Indian television actor known for playing Bunny in Jeannie Aur Juju. He worked serials such as Janbaaz Sindbad as a Pathan and Swaragini - Jodein Rishton Ke Sur as Kartik Malhotra. He participated in the reality show Mujhse Shaadi Karoge.

Career

Acting
Mayur began his acting career with a role in the episodic Emotional Atyachar. He did a continuity role in Bade Achhe Lagte Hain and Kya Huaa Tera Vaada. However, his big break came in Jeannie Aur Juju on SAB TV. He is playing Yo Yo Bunny Singh.

Mayur Verma has also done an episodic for the show Emotional Atyachar season 4 on Bindass, where he played the role. He also appeared in Telugu TV Commercials for Keline (home appliances) by Dream Merchants Ad Film Production House and has done print advertisements for various brands. In end of the year 2014, he also got the chance to play the role in the highest TRP show CID. He was also selected for the reality show Bigg Boss season 10, but he opted out because of his other professional commitments. He reportedly got into a legal dispute with the Bigg Boss makers.

Tv Shows / Movies

Filmography

References

External links 
 Official website
 

1991 births
Living people
Male actors from Punjab, India
Indian male television actors
Male actors in Hindi cinema